Nicolaas Johannes John "Maks" van Dyk (born 21 January 1992) is a South African professional rugby union player for Exeter Chiefs. His regular position is prop.

Career

Youth

As a scholar at Paarl Boys' High School, Van Dyk represented  at the Under-18 Academy Week and Craven Week competitions in 2010. He then moved to Durban to join the  academy.

2012 IRB Junior World Championship

In 2012, Van Dyk was part of the South Africa Under-20 side that won the 2012 IRB Junior World Championship held in South Africa. He made substitute appearances in the matches against Ireland and England and started the semi-final against Argentina and the final against New Zealand.

Sharks

Van Dyk became a regular in the team during the 2013 Vodacom Cup, starting six of their eight matches (his first senior start coming against  in Cape Town) and coming on as a substitute in the other two.

Griquas

Leinster

Van Dyk joined Irish Pro12 side Leinster on a two-month loan deal in November 2014 during the South African rugby off-season. He made his debut in Leinster's 21–11 victory over Irish rivals Connacht in Round 10 of the 2014–15 Pro12, his only appearance for the Dublin-based side.

Cheetahs

Van Dyk joined Port Elizabeth-based side for the 2015 and 2016 seasons, even though he was still available for the during the 2015 Super Rugby season. He joined in pre-season training with the Kings prior to the 2015 Currie Cup Premier Division, but negotiated an early release from his contract and a return to the without playing a match for the Kings.

Toulouse

Van Dyk moved to France to join prior to the 2016–17 Top 14 season.

Harlequins 
In August 2020, it was confirmed that van Dyk had signed a short-term with Harlequins for the remainder of the 2019–20 season.

Exeter Chiefs 
In November 2020 it was announced that van Dyk would join Exeter Chiefs ahead of the 2020–21 season on an initial one-year deal.

References

South African rugby union players
Living people
1992 births
Rugby union players from Johannesburg
Cheetahs (rugby union) players
Sharks (Currie Cup) players
Griquas (rugby union) players
Rugby union props
Alumni of Paarl Boys' High School
South Africa Under-20 international rugby union players